Matn, sometimes spelled Metn (or preceded by the article El, as in El Matn), is a district (qadaa) in the Mount Lebanon Governorate of Lebanon, east of the Lebanon's capital Beirut. The district capital is Jdeideh (followed to Jdeideh, Bouchrieh, El Sedd Municipality).

Matn is one of the most popular areas in Lebanon, with its rich scenery and its splendid view of the Mediterranean. Matn's population is almost entirely Christian with some Druze in the region, mostly in Beit Mery, Broummana, Mtein and Zarooun.

The Matn district is also popularly known as Northern Matn District not to be confused with Southern Matn which is part of Baabda District and with Uppermost Matn which is part of Baabda District.

Municipalities

 
Districts of Lebanon